Flaumenhaft is a surname. Notable people with the surname include:

Harvey Flaumenhaft (born 1938), American scholar, media commentator, and academic administrator
Mera J. Flaumenhaft (1945–2018), American academic and translator